Rhopalostylis is a genus of two species of palms native to the South Pacific. Both are smooth-trunked, with regular ringed scars from fallen leaves. The leaves are 3–5 m in length, and the leaf bases encircle the trunk.

Distribution
Rhopalostylis baueri occurs on Norfolk Island and the Kermadec Islands northeast of New Zealand; the Kermadec Islands population, formerly separated as R. cheesemanii, was included in R. baueri in 2005 after comparison revealed no significant differences. R. sapida, known as the nikau palm, is the only palm native to mainland New Zealand, and is found in lowland forests in the North Island, in coastal areas of the South Island as far south as Banks Peninsula, and on the Chatham Islands at 44°S. R. sapida thus has the southernmost range of any palm genus.

Classification
Subfamily: Arecoideae; tribe: Areceae; subtribe: Rhopalostylidinae. Rhopalostylis is closely related to the Lord Howe Island genus Hedyscepe.

Species

References

de Lange, P.J.; Gardner, R.O.; Crowcroft, G.M.; Stalker, F.; Cameron, E.K.; Braggins, J.E; Christian, M.L. 2005: Vascular flora of Norfolk Island: some additions and taxonomic notes. New Zealand Journal of Botany 43: 563-596.

Kew palms checklist: Rhopalostylis

 
Arecaceae genera
Flora of New Zealand
Taxa named by Carl Georg Oscar Drude
Taxa named by Hermann Wendland
Flora of Norfolk Island
Flora of the Kermadec Islands